Albert Schwartz may refer to:
 Albert Schwartz (swimmer)
 Albert Schwartz (zoologist)
 Al Schwartz (writer), American screenwriter, television producer, and director

See also
 Albert Schwarz, Soviet and American mathematician and theoretical physicist
 Albert Schwarz (inventor), Austrian-born American inventor